The Journal of Intellectual & Developmental Disability is a multidisciplinary journal in the field of intellectual and developmental disability and the official journal of the Australasian Society for Intellectual Disability. The editor in chief is Professor Jennifer Clegg (Honorary Associate Professor, University of Nottingham, UK;  Adjunct Professor, La Trobe University, Australia).

External links

Australasian Society for the Study of Intellectual Disability

Neurology journals
Publications established in 1975
English-language journals
Quarterly journals
Taylor & Francis academic journals